The RML 64-pounder 64 cwt gun is a Rifled, Muzzle Loading (RML) naval, field or fortification artillery gun manufactured in England in the 19th century, which fired a projectile weighing approximately . "64 cwt" refers to the gun's weight rounded up to differentiate it from other "64-pounder" guns.

Description 
The calibre of 6.3 inches was chosen to enable it to fire remaining stocks of spherical shells originally made for the obsolete 32 pounder guns if necessary.

Mark I (adopted in 1864) and Mark II (adopted 1866) guns, and Mark III guns made from 1867 – April 1871 had wrought-iron inner "A" tubes surrounded by wrought-iron coils.

Mark III guns made after April 1871 were built with toughened mild steel "A" tubes, and earlier Mark III guns were re-tubed with steel and were classified as a siege gun in land service. Remaining guns with iron tubes were used for sea service.

Rifling of all guns consisted of 3 grooves, with a uniform twist of 1 turn in 40 calibres (i.e. 1 turn in 252 inches).

Ammunition 
Shrapnel shells could also be fired; a  shell with a  bursting charge propelling 234 metal balls.

Surviving Examples of Guns 

 Mark I, Mark II number 164 and Mark III guns at Fort George, near Inverness, Scotland, UK
 Mark III gun number 17, on board HMS Gannet, Chatham Dockyard, UK
 Mark III gun number 294, dated 1867, Nothe Fort, Weymouth, UK
 Mark III gun at Fort Brockhurst, Gosport, UK
 Two Mark III guns, including no. 318 dated 1867 at Pendennis Castle, Cornwall, UK
 Mark III guns number 462 and 463 at Fort Glanville, Adelaide, South Australia
 Mark III gun number 739, dated 1878, Townsville, Queensland, Australia
 Mark III gun number 742 dated 1878 - ex HMQS Otter (Queensland colonial navy) example displayed in Queens Park Toowoomba, Queensland, Australia
 Two Mark III guns, including No 729 dated 1878, at Fort Lytton Historic Military Precinct, Brisbane, Australia
 Lei Yue Mun Fort's Central Battery, Hong Kong
 6 guns at Fort Siloso, Singapore including Mark III gun Number 767, dated 1874
 RML 64-pr 64 cwt Mk 3 at Albert Park, Auckland, Auckland, New Zealand

Surviving Examples of Ammunition 
 RML 64pdr shell that has been fired, and RML 64 fuse at Fort Lytton Historic Military Precinct, Brisbane, Australia
 RML 64pdr Mark I shell (no fuse) is held in the collection of the Australian War Memorial, Canberra

See also 
 RML 64-pounder 71 cwt gun : conversion of SBML 8-inch 65 cwt gun

Notes and references

Bibliography 
 Treatise on the Construction and Manufacture of Ordnance in the British Service. War Office, UK, 1879
 Text Book of Gunnery, 1902. LONDON : PRINTED FOR HIS MAJESTY'S STATIONERY OFFICE, BY HARRISON AND SONS, ST. MARTIN'S LANE

External links 

 YouTube video showing re-enactment of loading and firing with blank cartridge at Fort Lytton, Queensland
 Handbook for the 64 – pr. R.M.L. gun of 64 cwt., marks I-III land service 1888, 1893, 1900, 1902 at State Library of Victoria
 Diagram of gun on 6-foot parapet platform mounting at Victorian Forts website
1916 "The Brisbane Courier" newspaper clipping showing the 64 pounder muzzle loader siege gun,bearing the date 1881, that was on the beach, at Manly (Queensland, Australia) for many years.  It may now be one of the surviving guns at Fort Lytton.  https://trove.nla.gov.au/newspaper/page/1588925  Here are links to other photos of the same gun  https://library-brisbane.ent.sirsidynix.net.au/client/en_AU/search/asset/23652/0  https://library-brisbane.ent.sirsidynix.net.au/client/en_AU/search/asset/23748/0  https://library-brisbane.ent.sirsidynix.net.au/client/en_AU/search/asset/23373/0

Naval guns of the United Kingdom
Artillery of the United Kingdom
Elswick Ordnance Company
160 mm artillery
Victorian-era weapons of the United Kingdom